Jonathan Macgregor Dickson (born July 26, 1974) is an American actor. He is best known for his role as Professor Blackjack (Edward O. Thorp) on the History Channel's Breaking Vegas series. He has also appeared in such shows as 30 ROCK and Boardwalk Empire.  He can be seen shag dancing next to Rachel McAdams and James Marsden in the romantic drama, The Notebook.

Personal life 
Dickson was born and raised in Anderson, South Carolina, the son of John and Sandra Dickson, and the brother of Jennifer Dickson Meeks and Jason Dickson. He attended the University of South Carolina in Columbia, SC, and graduated with a major in biology and a minor in chemistry.

Career 
Dickson played Dr. Edward O. Thorp in Breaking Vegas. In 2009, he was cast on 30 ROCK, and in 2011 began acting in Boardwalk Empire. In 2012, he played himself on the Bravo reality show, Love Broker. Currently, he is performing standup comedy.

Filmography

Film and television

Theatre

Awards and nominations

References

External links 
 
 
 Love Broker Episode
 Breaking Vegas Article

1974 births
Living people
University of South Carolina alumni
People from Anderson, South Carolina
Male actors from South Carolina
American male stage actors
20th-century American male actors
21st-century American male actors
American male film actors
American male television actors